Tetraena stapfii (Afrikaans: daalderplant, English: dollar bush) is a species of flowering bush endemic to Namibia.

It grows in the Namib ecoregion along the Atlantic Ocean coast. Most of this plant's moisture comes from the morning mist. The shrub's round, coin-like leaves lend it its colloquial name: daalder is an old Dutch coin worth one and a half guilders.

Image Gallery

References

Endemic flora of Namibia
Zygophylloideae
Plants described in 2003